Walters Room is a studio album by Black Science Orchestra, released on Junior Boy's Own in 1996. The title is a reference to Walter Gibbons. It debuted at number 68 on the UK Albums Chart. In 2008, it was re-released with additional bonus tracks.

Track listing

Personnel
 Ashley Beedle – percussion, keyboards, drum programming, vocals
 Marc Woolford – keyboards, programming, vocals
 Uschi Classen – keyboards, string arrangement, vocals
 Amy Simmons – flute
 David Alvarez – drums
 Dave Maggio – saxophone
 Lewis Rhone – trombone
 Charles Marin – trumpet
 Stella Hinton – guitar
 Tommy D – keyboards, vocals
 Oscar Ronindéz – percussion
 Carl Walker – vibraphone
 The Classenic String Ensemble – strings
 Steve Lucas – vocals
 Carla Hendry – vocals
 Sister Soul – vocals

Charts

References

External links
 

1996 debut albums
Junior Boy's Own albums